Riverbank High School is located at 6200 Claus Road in Riverbank, California, and is one of the two high schools in the Riverbank Unified School District along with Adelante High School, an alternative education school.

Athletics 
The school's sports teams are known as the Bruins. In 2008, Riverbank's German Fernandez set a national record in the 3200m while winning the California State High School championship in the 1,600 meters (4:00.29) and the 3,200 meters (8:34.23) runs. He later broke the 2 mile record at the Nike Outdoor Nationals. He went on to set the World Junior Record for the Indoor Mile, 3:55.02, and American Junior Record for the 5000 meter, 13:25.46, in his freshman year at Oklahoma State University.

Colorguard
Riverbank High Colorguard was a World Guard 2008–2009.

References

External links
Riverbank High School

Public high schools in California
High schools in Stanislaus County, California